The Karagash (or as they call themselves, Qaragashly, and Qaragash-nogailar) are one of the ethnic Nogay groups that live in the vicinity of Astrakhan, Russia. The largest Karagash settlement is the town of Rastopulovka.

Sources
Wixman, Ronald.  The Peoples of the Soviet Union: An Ethnographic Handbook. (Armonk: M. E> Sharp, 1984) p. 93

Ethnic groups in Russia
Peoples of the Caucasus
Muslim communities of the Caucasus